John David Logan (born September 24, 1961) is an American playwright and filmmaker. He is known for his work as a screenwriter for such films as Martin Scorsese's The Aviator (2004) and Hugo (2011), Tim Burton's Sweeney Todd: The Demon Barber of Fleet Street (2007) and Sam Mendes's James Bond films Skyfall (2012), and Spectre (2015). He has been nominated three times for Academy Awards, and has won a Tony Award and a Golden Globe Award.

Early life and education
Logan's parents immigrated to the United States from Northern Ireland via Canada. The youngest of three children, he has an older brother and sister. Logan grew up in California and Millburn, New Jersey, where he graduated from Millburn High School in 1979.

He moved to Chicago to attend Northwestern University, where he graduated in 1983.

Career

Stage
Logan was a successful playwright in Chicago for many years before turning to screenwriting. His first play, Never the Sinner, tells the story of the infamous Leopold and Loeb case. Subsequent plays include Hauptmann, about the Lindbergh baby kidnapping, and Riverview, a musical melodrama set at Chicago's famed amusement park.

His play Red, about artist Mark Rothko, was produced by the Donmar Warehouse, London, in December 2009, and on Broadway in 2010, where it received six Tony Awards, the most of any play, including best play, best direction of a play for Michael Grandage and best featured actor in a play for Eddie Redmayne. Redmayne and Alfred Molina had originated their roles in London and also performed on Broadway, for a limited run ending in late June.

Two plays by Logan premiered in 2013; Peter and Alice, directed by Michael Grandage and starring Judi Dench and Ben Whishaw opened in London at the Noël Coward Theatre on March 25, 2013 and I'll Eat You Last: A Chat with Sue Mengers, directed by Joe Mantello and starring Bette Midler, opened on Broadway at the Booth Theatre on April 24, 2013.

A re-written version of Never the Sinner had its world premiere in 2004 at the Space Theatre in Adelaide, Australia, by Independent Theatre. The company had previously staged the play twice, in 1992 and 1994, and has also staged several of his other plays.

Superhero, a new musical by Logan and Tom Kitt, had its world premiere production Off-Broadway at Second Stage Theater, with an official opening night on February 28, 2019.

Film and TV
Logan wrote the 1999 Oliver Stone sports drama Any Given Sunday, which "changed his life". He then wrote the television film RKO 281, a historical drama released in the same year.

Logan's feature films include Rango (2011), an animated feature starring Johnny Depp and directed by Gore Verbinski; the film adaptation of Shakespeare's Coriolanus, directed by and starring Ralph Fiennes; Hugo, an adaptation of the book The Invention of Hugo Cabret, directed by Martin Scorsese; and the James Bond film Skyfall, along with Neal Purvis and Robert Wade. He wrote the Bond film, Spectre (2015).

He also created the 2014 television series Penny Dreadful starring Josh Hartnett, Eva Green and Timothy Dalton, for which he served as sole writer until it concluded with its third season.

In November 2015, Logan was reported to have rewritten the script for Alien: Covenant. During the audio commentary of Alien: Covenant, Scott mentions that Logan has already started writing Alien: Covenant 2. In November 2018, it was announced that Showtime would produce a follow-up to the 2014 television series Penny Dreadful entitled Penny Dreadful: City of Angels, which takes place in Los Angeles in 1938. Logan was the creator, executive producer, and sole writer for the show, which premiered in 2020.

In November 2019, it was reported that Bohemian Rhapsody producer Graham King was planning to produce a Michael Jackson biopic, with the screenplay written by Logan.

Other notable films written by Logan include Star Trek: Nemesis, The Time Machine, and The Last Samurai.

Logan made his feature directorial debut in 2022 with They/Them, a slasher film released via the streaming service Peacock.

Accolades

2000: Nominated for a Primetime Emmy Award for Outstanding Writing for a Limited Series or Movie for RKO 281
Academy Awards:
Best Original Screenplay for Gladiator (2000), co-written (with David Franzoni and William Nicholson)
Best Original Screenplay, for The Aviator (2004)
Best Adapted Screenplay, for Hugo (2011)
Winner, Golden Globe Award, for the 2007 Tim Burton musical Sweeney Todd: The Demon Barber of Fleet Street
Tony Awards:
Winner, Best Play for Red (2010)
Nominated, Best Book of a Musical for Moulin Rouge! (2020)

Personal life and other activities
Logan is openly gay.

 he is a major benefactor of a small independent theatre company in Adelaide, South Australia, run by Rob Croser, called Independent Theatre. Several of his plays have been produced there, including Never the Sinner (1992, 1994, 2004); Hauptmann (1993); The View from Golgotha (1996); Red (2011; about artist Mark Rothko); Peter and Alice (2014), and he has travelled to Adelaide several times to see his plays as well as work on other productions.

Selected plays
Logan's plays include:

 Never the Sinner (1985)
 Speaking in Tongues (1988)
 Hauptmann (1991)
 Riverview (1992)
The View from Golgotha (1996);
 Red (2009)
 Peter and Alice (2013)
 I'll Eat You Last: A Chat with Sue Mengers (2013)
 The Last Ship (2014)
 Moulin Rouge! (2018)
 Superhero (2019)

Filmography

Film

Television

References

External links
 
 2008 Interview with John Logan

1961 births
20th-century American male writers
21st-century American male writers
American dramatists and playwrights
American male dramatists and playwrights
American male screenwriters
American people of Northern Ireland descent
American people of Canadian descent
American television writers
Animation screenwriters
Annie Award winners
Film producers from California
Film producers from New Jersey
Film producers from New York (state)
American gay writers
Golden Globe Award-winning producers
LGBT people from California
LGBT people from New Jersey
American LGBT screenwriters
Living people
American male television writers
Millburn High School alumni
Northwestern University School of Communication alumni
People from Millburn, New Jersey
Screenwriters from California
Screenwriters from New Jersey
Screenwriters from New York (state)
Tony Award winners
Writers from San Diego
Writers Guild of America Award winners